S. ornatus may refer to:
 Scotomanes ornatus, the harlequin bat, a vesper bat species
 Sorex ornatus, the ornate shrew, a mammal species
 Spizaetus ornatus, the ornate hawk-eagle, a bird of prey species
 Stenocercus ornatus, is a species of lizard of the Tropiduridae family

See also
 Ornatus